It Happened Out West is a 1937 American Western film directed by Howard Bretherton and written by Earle Snell and John Roberts. The film stars Paul Kelly, Judith Allen, Johnny Arthur, LeRoy Mason, Lew Kelly, and Russell Hicks. The film was released on May 2, 1937, by 20th Century Fox.

Plot
An outlaw tries to cheat an Arizona rancher out of her silver-rich land.

Cast   
Paul Kelly as Richard P. 'Dick' Howe
Judith Allen as Ann Martin
Johnny Arthur as Professor Thad Crookshank
LeRoy Mason as Bert Travis
Lew Kelly as Diner Counterman
Russell Hicks as Cooley
Henry Otho as Henchman Hank
Ted Adams as Henchman Tex 
Reginald Barlow as Middleton
Steve Clemente as Pedro 
Nina Campana as Maria
Ed Brady as Sheriff (uncredited)
Ben Corbett as Gimpy (uncredited)
Henry Hall as Man Who Points Out Cafe (uncredited)
Archie Ricks as Red (uncredited)
Bob Woodward as Tom Roberts (uncredited)

References

External links

Lobby cards #1 and #2 at lombardiabeniculturali.it

1937 films
20th Century Fox films
American Western (genre) films
1937 Western (genre) films
Films directed by Howard Bretherton
American black-and-white films
Films produced by Sol Lesser
1930s English-language films
1930s American films